My Dinner with Andre is a 1981 American comedy-drama film directed by Louis Malle, and written by and starring André Gregory and Wallace Shawn as fictionalized versions of themselves sharing a conversation at Café des Artistes in Manhattan. The film's dialogue covers topics such as experimental theater, the nature of theater, and the nature of life, and contrasts Andre's spiritual experiences with Wally's modest humanism.

Plot
Struggling playwright Wally dreads having dinner with his old friend Andre, whom he has been avoiding since Andre gave up his career as a theater director in 1975 and embarked on an extended spiritual midlife crisis. In a fancy New York restaurant, Andre tells Wally about some of the adventures he has had since they last saw each other, which include working with his mentor, the director Jerzy Grotowski, and a group of Polish actors in a forest in Poland, traveling to the Sahara to try to create a play based on The Little Prince by Saint-Exupéry, and visiting Findhorn in Scotland. The last in this string of events was when Andre and a small group of friends arranged Halloween-themed experiences for each other, and one piece consisted of the participants being briefly buried alive.

While Andre says he needed to do all of these things to get out of the rut he was in and learn how to be human, Wally argues that living as Andre has done for the past several years is simply not possible for most people, and he describes how he finds pleasure in more ordinary things, like a cup of coffee or his new electric blanket. Andre asserts that focusing too much on comfort can be dangerous, and says that what passes for normal life in New York in the late 1970s is more akin to living in a dream than living in reality. While Wally agrees with many of Andre's criticisms of modern society, he takes issue with the more mystical aspects of Andre's stories, as he has a rational and scientific worldview.

After all of the other customers have already left the restaurant, the friends, each having expressed themselves openly and feeling heard by the other, part on good terms. Since Andre paid for dinner, Wally treats himself to a taxi ride, and he notices feeling a deep connection to all of the familiar places he passes on the way home. He narrates that, when he sees his girlfriend Debbie, he tells her all about his dinner with Andre.

Cast
 André Gregory as Andre
 Wallace Shawn as Wally
 Jean Lenauer as Waiter
 Roy Butler as Bartender
 Cindy Lou Adkins as Coat-Check Girl (uncredited)

Production
After spending several years away from the theater, André Gregory was looking to get back into it, so he asked his friend Wallace Shawn if he wanted to do something together. Shawn knew Gregory wanted to tell his story, even working with a biographer at one point, and suggested they develop a story consisting of a conversation between the two of them, with interest coming from their contrasting personalities and Gregory's anecdotes. Having recently acted in his first few films, Shawn saw the project as a film, rather than a play.

Although the film was based on events in the actors' lives, Gregory and Shawn denied (in an interview with film critic Roger Ebert) they were simply playing themselves, and said that, if they remade the film, they would swap characters to prove their point. In an interview with Noah Baumbach in 2009, Shawn said:

While Shawn and Gregory were trying to find someone to direct the film, Gregory received a phone call, which he initially thought was a prank, from French director Louis Malle, who said he had read a copy of the screenplay he received from a mutual friend and he wanted to direct the film, or even just be a producer, if Gregory and Shawn did not think he was the right director. The writers brought Malle on board, and he worked with them to cut an hour from the three-hour script. Though Shawn later said he had carefully constructed the screenplay and would have preferred to make the longer film, but Malle won most of the arguments, he credited Malle with infusing the film with a warmth that helped it connect with audiences.

A rehearsal held at a restaurant caused Malle to question whether the setting of the film should be changed, as the eating seemed likely to create problems. Shawn and Gregory tried to think of what else their characters could be doing, but they wound up just having Gregory not eat very much, as he is the one who does most of the talking in the film.

My Dinner with Andre was filmed in December 1980 in Richmond, Virginia, in the then-vacant Jefferson Hotel, which has since been restored and reopened as a luxury venue. The set was designed to look like the Café des Artistes in New York City, and the shoot lasted two weeks. Lloyd Kaufman was the film's production manager, and Troma Entertainment provided production support.

Notes
Throughout the film, Andre refers to his wife "Chiquita". In real life, André Gregory was married to Mercedes "Chiquita" Nebelthau until her death in 1992. Nebelthau was a documentary filmmaker whose credits include three films about Jerzy Grotowski, whom Andre and Wally discuss in the film.

In the film, Wally refers several times to his "girlfriend Debbie". Wallace Shawn's longtime partner in real life is the short story writer Deborah Eisenberg, who had not yet published anything at the time of the film. Eisenberg makes an appearance early in the film as a dark-haired diner Wally sees as he scans the restaurant while standing at the bar waiting for Andre.

At one point in the film, Andre refers to "ROC", the Scottish mathematician who claimed he met fauns and the god Pan.  That man is Robert Ogilvie Crombie, one of the founders of the Findhorn Foundation.

Release
The film had its world premiere at the Telluride Film Festival.

Reception
On review aggregator website Rotten Tomatoes, the film has an approval rating of 92% based on 25 reviews, with an average score of 7.8 out of 10. On Metacritic it has a score of 83 out of 100 based on 15 reviews, indicating "universal acclaim".

Roger Ebert and Gene Siskel gave high praise to the film on Sneak Previews, support that the producers told Ebert helped keep the film in theaters for a year. Ebert chose it as the best film of 1981, and he and Siskel later ranked it as the fifth-best and fourth-best film, respectively, of the 1980s. In 1999, Ebert added the film to his Great Movies essay series, starting the retrospective review by stating: "Someone asked me the other day if I could name a movie that was entirely devoid of clichés. I thought for a moment, and then answered, My Dinner with Andre."

At the 2nd Boston Society of Film Critics Awards, the film won the award for Best American Film of 1981, and Shawn and Gregory won Best Screenplay.

In popular culture
 The July 21, 1982, comic of The Far Side by Gary Larson is a gag based on the title of this film.
 This film is parodied in the film My Breakfast with Blassie (1983), in which Andy Kaufman has a discussion over breakfast at a diner with professional wrestling manager "Classy" Freddie Blassie.
 The title of the American CGI-animated short film The Adventures of André & Wally B. (1984) is a tribute to this film.
 In the fifth-season episode of The Simpsons entitled "Boy-Scoutz 'n the Hood" (1993), Martin Prince plays an arcade game based on this film.
 The first season of the sitcom Frasier concludes with an episode titled "My Coffee with Niles" (1994), which is loosely based on this film's premise and structure. This film is also directly mentioned in "The Zoo Story" (1998), an episode in the fifth season of the series, when Martin says, mockingly, after he and Niles get their VHS tapes mixed up: "Yeah, well, that's the way Duke and I felt about My Dinner With Andre. Talk about suspense! Will they order dessert? Will they leave a good tip?"
 During the end credits of the film Waiting For Guffman (1996), Corky St. Clair is shown displaying his action figures of the characters from this film.
 The second-season episode of the television series Community entitled "Critical Film Studies" (2011) pays homage to this film.
 The opening scene of the first-season episode of Nirvanna the Band the Show entitled "The Buffet" (2017) shows the main character mimicking Wally's actions from the beginning of this film: walking in the city, waiting for a subway, and putting on a tie before entering a restaurant.
 Independent film director Maverick Moore parodied both this film and "the totally bonkers friendship between legendary filmmaker Werner Herzog and controversial actor Klaus Kinski", as chronicled in the documentaries Burden of Dreams and My Best Fiend, in the awarding -winning short film My Dinner with Werner (2019).
 The title of the premiere episode of the fifth season of Rick and Morty, "Mort Dinner Rick Andre" (2021), is a parody of the title of this film.

See also
 Robert Ogilvie Crombie – a Scottish spiritualist and writer referenced in the film

References

External links

 
 
 
 
 
 
 My Dinner with André: Long, Strange Trips an essay by Amy Taubin at the Criterion Collection

1981 films
1981 comedy-drama films
American comedy-drama films
1980s English-language films
Films about philosophy
Philosophical fiction
Films directed by Louis Malle
Films set in Manhattan
Films set in restaurants
Films shot in Virginia
Findhorn community
Media containing Gymnopedies
Films with screenplays by Wallace Shawn
Films about food and drink
Two-handers
Films about conversations
1980s American films